James Ronald Henry was an American football player and coach.  He played college football at the University of Michigan in 1897 and the University of Chicago from 1898 to 1900.  He was selected to the 1900 All-Western college football team as a halfback.  Henry served the head football coach at DePauw University for one season in 1902 and at Vanderbilt University for one season in 1903, compiling a career college football coaching record of 11–6–1.  He later worked as a general manager of factories for National Biscuit Company in Chicago.

Head coaching record

References

Year of birth missing
Year of death missing
19th-century players of American football
American football ends
American football halfbacks
Chicago Maroons football players
DePauw Tigers football coaches
Michigan Wolverines football players
Vanderbilt Commodores football coaches